The Big Hill is on the Canadian Pacific Railway main line in British Columbia, Canada.

Big Hill may also refer to:

Australia
 Big Hill, New South Wales, a rural locality
 Big Hill, Victoria (City of Greater Bendigo), a rural locality
 Big Hill, Victoria (Surf Coast Shire), a coastal locality

Canada
Big Hill (Alberta), a hill
Big Hill, Nova Scotia, a county municipality on Cape Breton Island
Nels Nelsen Hill, originally Big Hill, a ski jumping hill in Revelstoke, British Columbia

United States
Big Hill (Idaho), a hill east of Montpelier
Big Hill, Indiana, an unincorporated community in Rochester Township, Fulton County
Big Hill (Missouri), a hill in St. Francois County
Big Hill (Carter County, Montana), a mountain in Carter County
Big Hill (Custer County, Montana), a mountain in Custer County
Big Hill Farmstead Historic District, in Jackson, Missouri
Big Hill Formation, a geological formation in Michigan
Big Hill Lake, near Parsons, Kansas